La Fermière is a monument in Montreal. It is a statue by Alfred Laliberté, depicting local historical figure Louise Mauger as a market gardener.

Overview 

The fountain monument of Marius Dufresne is composed of a statue by Alfred Laliberté (1877–1953) which depicts a market gardener of the 17th century. Alfred Laliberté knows the history and heroes of French colonization. Without naming her, this monument refers to Louise Mauger (1598–1690).

Born in France in 1598, she married Pierre Gadoys, around 1620, and had three children, two born in France and the last one in Quebec City. She was buried on March 18, 1690, in Montreal. 

The monument was completed in 1915. La Fermière is situated in front of the Maisonneuve Market; the market is on Ontario Street and is at the head of the Morgan Boulevard.

Gallery

Notes

 La Fermière 

1915 sculptures
History of Montreal
Monuments and memorials in Montreal
1915 in Canada
Bronze sculptures in Canada
Statues in Canada
Outdoor sculptures in Montreal
Cultural depictions of Canadian women